The 2015 Mid-American Conference women's basketball tournament was the post-season basketball tournament for the Mid-American Conference (MAC) 2014–15 college basketball season. The 2015 tournament was held March 9–14, 2015. Top seed Ohio won the tournament by beating sixth-seeded Eastern Michigan 60–44 in the final. They lost to Arizona State in the first round NCAA tournament. Kiyanna Black of Ohio was the MVP.

Format
First round games were held on campus sites at the higher seed on March 10. The remaining rounds were held at Quicken Loans Arena, between March 11–14. As with the previous tournaments, the top two seeds received byes into the semifinals, with the three and four seeds receiving a bye to the quarterfinals.

Schedule

Bracket

All times listed are Eastern

All-Tournament Team
Tournament MVP – Kiyanna Black, Ohio

References

Mid-American Conference women's basketball tournament
2014–15 NCAA Division I women's basketball season
2014–15 Mid-American Conference women's basketball season
Basketball competitions in Cleveland
College basketball tournaments in Ohio
Women's sports in Ohio
2010s in Cleveland
2015 in sports in Ohio